Sedum hispanicum, the Spanish stonecrop, is a species of plant in the family Crassulaceae.

Description
Annual, 5–15 cm, glabrous or somewhat pubescent. Stems branching. Leaves alternate, 7–10 mm, linear, rounded. Flowers usually 6-merous, sometimes 7-9-merous, in unilateral cymes. Sepals ovate-acute.
Petals white, with a purple midrib, 5–7 mm, lanceolate, acuminate. Carpels stellate.

Flowering
March–June.

Habitat
Rocks.

Distribution

Coast, lower, middle and upper mountains, Beqaa, Antilebanon.

Geographic area
Syria, Lebanon, the Palestine region, Western Asia, the Balkans, Italy, and
Switzerland.

Notwithstanding its specific name this stonecrop is not found in Spain. Sedum is the Latin name of the adjoining genus, Sempervivum, houseleek. It is
derived from sedare, to appease, to tranquillize, since the houseleek cultivated on housetops was supposed to take away the thunder, or probably because the
crushed leaves used in plasters have a sedative action.

References

Georges Tohme& Henriette Tohme, IIIustrated Flora of Lebanon, National Council For Scientific Research, Second Edition 2014.

hispanicum
Flora of Lebanon and Syria
Flora of Palestine (region)
Flora of Southeastern Europe
Flora of Switzerland
Plants described in 1755
Taxa named by Carl Linnaeus